Radio Forest is a registered charity in the UK and has been providing radio services in West Essex, for the last thirty years. Currently based at St. Margaret's Hospital in Epping, it broadcasts two radio services to four different hospitals within the West Essex Primary Care Trust and the North Essex Mental Health Partnership Trust. Radio Forest is a member of the Hospital Broadcasting Association and is run by a team of unpaid volunteers.

Forest One broadcasts 24 hours a day to everyone at St. Margaret's Hospital and the Derwent Centre and is aimed at a younger audience. Playing music from the 1980s onwards together with today's new music, with local and national news and features. Also available online, "play Forest One Radio".

Classic Hits Forest Gold was launched in 2002 and caters for the older audience at St. Margaret's, Brentwood Community Hospital and Saffron Walden Community Hospital. Forest Gold broadcasts 24 hours a day the best music from the 1950s, 1960s, 1970s, 1980s and 1990s with local and national news and features. Also available online, "play Forest Gold Radio".

History
Radio Forest (originally known as 'Forest Radio') was established in November 1976, the brainchild of local estate agent Heather Thirtle, providing music and entertainment to the patients and staff of the Forest Hospital in Buckhurst Hill, Essex. A small team of eight people including co founder Nick Churchill, Noel Carter, Christopher Potter and Kenneth Warriner, built studios and equipment and got the station on air. In 1978 Stuart McDonald became the first elected Chairman and registered Radio Forest as a charity "to relieve sickness through entertainment"! By 1980 the organisation had grown with 30 people providing a radio service six nights a week. The studios expanded and moved to St. Margaret’s Hospital, Epping in 1980 but continued to broadcast to the Forest Hospital via a landline until it eventually closed. By the mid 1980s over 40 volunteers were broadcasting, ward visiting and raising funds seven days a week.

Radio Forest continued to expand and in 1990 opened its third on air studio. Further new equipment enabled the station to provide recorded music and information overnight. In 1996 Radio Forest was granted a license by the Radio Authority (later Ofcom), to broadcast on FM for 28 days to the Epping Forest area over the Christmas period. The public response was incredible, enabling the station to compete commercially with other local stations and raise much needed funds.

A move within St. Margaret's Hospital in 1999 meant the building of a new studio and the embracing of modern digital technology. Radio Forest was once again a pioneer by developing its own digital sustaining service, with the ability to provide a true 24-hour service including local and national news. In 2002 Radio Forest opened a dedicated Production Area allowing more flexible programming, audio production and volunteer training. In November 2002 Radio Forest launched its second radio service 'Classic Hits Forest Gold'. Broadcasting a non stop mix of hits form the 1950s, 1960s and 1970s. 'Classic Hits Forest Gold' proved to be a popular addition to the St. Margaret's Hospital airwaves. In 2003 'Classic Hits Forest Gold' launched at Ongar War memorial Community Hospital, in Essex, via a radio link and in 2005 Radio Forest was also able to provide 'Classic Hits Forest Gold' to Plane, Poplar and Orchard wards at St. Margaret's Hospital.

A complete refurbishment of the audio distribution system at St. Margaret's Hospital was completed in 2006, replacing the original system first installed during the 1950s.

In 2007 a brand new hospital on the St. Margaret's site was completed and Radio Forest installed speakers and bedside audio facilities to the four new ward areas, allowing a choice of listening including 'Radio Forest FM' and 'Classic Hits Forest Gold'. A new on-air studio was also completed and the original studio dating from 1999 was re-furbished, allowing for more live programmes on both radio services.

In 2008 Radio Forest expanded its service to the Derwent Centre in Harlow and 'Radio Forest FM' was renamed 'Forest One'. Ongar War Memorial Hospital closed in October 2008 but "Classic Hits Forest Gold" was extended to Saffron Walden Community Hospital instead just as the hospital completed a 2 million pound refurbishment.

In 2009 The Spencer Close Unit (within the grounds of St. Margaret's Hospital) was closed and some of the patients transferred to a new home in Epping. Forest One followed them to their new accommodation and continues to provide a service for them.

In 2010 Brentwood Community Hospital became the latest hospital to have "Classic Hits Forest Gold" installed in all its public areas and wards. This project was part funded by the Brentwood Community Hospital League of Friends.

In 2012 "Classic Hits Forest Gold" celebrated its 10th birthday and was launched as an online internet radio station while at the same time maintaining its core hospital radio ethos.

In 2021 Classic Hits Forest Gold was awarded an FM frequency for the St. Margaret's area of Epping and can be heard on 99.3FM.

Today Classic Hits Forest Gold has found a new audience away from the hospital and has thousands of listeners all over the world, who regularly tune in to hear the best oldies radio station on the air.

Locations
 Forest Hospital, Buckhurst Hill, Essex, UK (ceased 1985)
 St. Margaret's Hospital, Epping, Essex, UK
 Spencer Close Unit, Epping, Essex, UK (ceased 2009)
 The Ongar War Memorial Community Hospital, Chipping Ongar, Essex, UK (ceased 2008)
 The Derwent Centre, Harlow, Essex, UK
 Saffron Walden Community Hospital, Saffron Walden, Essex, UK
 Brentwood Community Hospital, Brentwood, Essex, UK
 Epping, Essex, UK

External links
 Radio Forest Official website

Hospital radio stations
Radio stations in Essex
Radio stations established in 1976
Charities based in the United Kingdom